Forlì del Sannio is a comune (municipality) in the Province of Isernia in the Italian region Molise, located about  northwest of Campobasso and about  northwest of Isernia.

Twin towns
 Rives, France

References

Cities and towns in Molise